The Bacon Academy, nicknamed Old Bacon Academy, was the original Bacon Academy. The Old Bacon Academy was built in 1803 and is located at 84 Main Street, Colchester, Connecticut. The main structure is a  long by  wide three-story Flemish bond brick structure with Federal style details. Noted for its plain, utilitarian floor plan consisting of two rooms off a central hall and stairway, the inside has seen some renovations throughout its history. The Day Hall, a contributing property purchased by the Bacon Academy trustees in 1929, is a church hall that was used for the high school until 1962.

Originally operating as a white male school, Bacon Academy integrated "negroes and persons of color" around 1833 and began to educate women in 1842. The school has educated important figures like Edwin Denison Morgan, Morgan Bulkeley, William A. Buckingham, Lyman Trumbull, and Morrison Waite. Due to the structure's utilitarian style combined with its Federal details, the National Register of Historic Places recognizes it as architecturally significant. Currently, the Old Bacon Academy building is used as part of an alternative education program and Day Hall is used as a nursery. The properties were added to the National Register of Historic Places in 1982.

Design 
Bacon Academy is named for Pierpont Bacon, a prosperous farmer who died childless in 1800. Bacon bequeathed most of his property and assets to the First Society of Colchester to support schooling. The trustees decided to build an academy, an institution to have young men be educated, and then go directly into the workforce. Completed in 1803 for the cost of $7000, the main Bacon Academy structure is a  long by  wide three-story Flemish bond brick structure with Federal style details. The foundation of the academy is made of fieldstone with a facing of dressed granite blocks. The bricks were produced on a local farm for the purpose building Bacon Academy. The front facade has 26 windows arranged in 9 bays with gaps for the chimneys in between the second and third bay from the corners. The sash is 6-by-6 and was noted to appear original in the nomination form. Originally the hipped roof had four chimneys, with two matching chimneys on each the west and east sides. Only the east chimneys remain. In the 1982 nomination, the hipped roof was reported to have asphalt shingles.

The building was altered in 1890, with two additions of Victorian architecture, the first being the main entrance, above the fanlight, is an arched awning with incised consoles. The other addition was the octagonal cupola on the roof over the original bell tower which dates from 1830. The exterior of the school has complementary colors. The walls are painted a cream color while the foundation, doors, window trims, and cornices are a chocolate-brown.

The interior of the building was termed "severely plain" and utilitarian for its simple design of two large rooms on each side with a central hall and stairwell.  Each room was filled with natural light from the windows, and had a chimney for the iron stoves on the east and west ends of the building. The oak floors were installed in the early 20th-century and the ceiling was covered with modern acoustical tiles. The third floor is a shallow attic that gives access to the cupola. The ceiling and roof framing is supported with two king-post trusses at the ends of the main ridge. The basement is divided into halves and supported by summer beams that run the length of the sills and supported by posts on stone pedestals. By 1982, the steel I-beams were "recently" inserted under the floor joists and between the summer and the sills. The cellar also has an old furnace that is not in service due to the building using electrical heating.

The other contributing property, Day Hall, is a church hall that was originally built in 1858. It was acquired and used for "high school purposes" from 1929 until they completed construction of the new Bacon Academy in 1962. After that it was adopted for use as a kindergarten and offices for the trustees. Described as "vaguely Italianate", the one-room church hall has a basement and a T-shaped addition dating to around 1928. It has a steep gabled, hipped roof. The entrance has two modern fire doors that lead to an auditorium and gallery on the east and stage on the west end.

Operation 
The school was originally only for white male students, with "negroes and persons of color" using a separate facility, but integration occurred thirty years later and the school also began to educate women in 1842. Throughout the first 136 years of Bacon Academy's operation its endowment was its sole provider of funding. In 1939, the town began contributing funds to the institution, resulting in the loss of complete control of its own affairs. In 1982, at the time of its National Register of Historic Places nomination, the trust provided a "small percentage" of Bacon Academy's funding.

In 2013, the Bacon Academy building was used by the school as part of an alternative education program and Day Hall functions as a nursery school. The school is rented by the Board of Education for around $21,000 a year and the Bacon Academy Board of Trustees says that the operational costs are between $25,000 and $28,000 a year. According to the Colchester Public Schools website, "the Mission of the Alternative Education Program is to provide academic, social, and emotional supports for students at risk of dropping out of high school."

Importance 
The National Register of Historic Places nomination submitted Bacon Academy as being important under criteria A, B and C. Bacon Academy's development in the 176 years, up to the time of nomination, represents the evolution of social attitudes and ideas of education; criteria A. Under criteria B, Bacon Academy is associated with numerous influential and prominent figures. The school was responsible for educating New York governor and senator Edwin Denison Morgan, Connecticut governors Morgan Bulkeley and William A. Buckingham, Iowa senator Lyman Trumbull, and Morrison Waite, the Chief Justice of the United States Supreme Court. Criteria C reflects the architectural significance and merit of the structure which is only impeded by its Victorian-era cupola. It was listed on the National Register of Historic Places in 1982.

See also
National Register of Historic Places listings in New London County, Connecticut

References

National Register of Historic Places in New London County, Connecticut
Federal architecture in Connecticut
Italianate architecture in Connecticut
School buildings completed in 1803
Buildings and structures in New London County, Connecticut
Colchester, Connecticut